Robert Blinkhorn (c. 1814 – 31 October 1888) was a prominent Gloucester businessman and local political figure.

Career
Robert and his wife Eleanor were both born in Maidstone, Kent and moved to Gloucester later. He established the Blinkhorns drapery store in Gloucester's Eastgate Street in 1843 which grew to be an important local business but eventually ceased trading in 1953 on its sale to F. W. Woolworth & Co. He was a director of the Gloucester Railway Carriage and Wagon Company at the time of his death and an Alderman of the City of Gloucester.

Death
Robert Blinkorn died on 31 October 1888. He is buried at Tredworth Road Cemetery in the same plot as his wife Eleanor (died 20 February 1895) and three younger Blinkhorns, Alice, Ellen and Robert.

See also
John Blinkhorn

References

External links
Blinkhorn Genealogy.

1810s births
1888 deaths
People from Gloucester
People from Maidstone
19th-century English businesspeople
Burials in Gloucestershire